This is a list of defunct airlines of Germany.

See also
 List of airlines of Germany
 List of airports in Germany

References

Germany
Airlines
Airlines, defunct